Zevo-3 is an American animated television series co-produced by Maslen Entertainment, MoonScoop Entertainment and Skechers Entertainment for Nicktoons. It premiered on October 11, 2010 and ended on May 7, 2011 after one season. It is based on the fictional superheroes Z-Strap, Kewl Breeze, and Elastika, characters that previously appeared in Skechers commercials.

Premise
The show is about three teens who get powers in a lab when Zevo compound covers them, due to an experiment done by the evil Doctor Stankfoot. Together they fight off mutant monsters that arise while dealing with their own teenage problems, including school, friends, and feelings.

Cast and characters

Main characters
 Jason James/Z-Strap (voiced by Bryton James): A loner that loves to go free running over in Stankville. He met Ellie/Elastika and her brother Matt/Kewl Breeze when he almost ran them over at the chemical plant. He controls metal objects, and can turn his appendages into metal objects (spears, cages, blocks, etc.). After being Zevoed he began to hang out with the siblings and has become a friend and older sibling to them both from time to time. It might seem like Ellie and Matt annoy him, and sometimes they do, but deep down he cares; showing compassion is just hard for him since he's still bitter about his parents leaving him. He lives on a barge outside of New Eden City with his Grams. It is revealed that his greatest fear is being alone; however, he is able to overcome that. He also seems to harbor awkward, romantic feelings for Ellie; this was shown when they nearly kissed before Matt interrupted to inform them of Mayor Bronson's status as a mutant. He's an urban sports enthusiast, and is an excellent skate boarder and free runner. He's also an artist, something he seemed to get into when his parents were killed in action.
 Matt Martin/Kewl Breeze (voiced by Dante Basco): Matt is the younger brother to Ellie/Elastika and looks up to Jason/Z-Strap like a role model and older brother. His powers involve manipulation of ice; and so far he's shown to be extremely powerful and skilled in their use. An example of his power level is shown when he instantly flash freezes a wall of ice taller and wider than the 50 ft tall robot brought to life by Jason's mutated blood. He's also nearly completely flash frozen Jason's barge, and has shown the ability to generate levels of cold close enough to liquid nitrogen that he can shatter metal. He was the one who accidentally released the Zevo Compound infecting him, Ellie and Jason. In the episode Welcome to Paradise Beach, it is revealed that his greatest fear is heat. Despite being the youngest of the group, Matt is easily the smartest, and shows super genius level intellect. So far he's invented a device that allowed Z-Strap to shrink himself to microscopic size due to his metal manipulation, an advanced communication system, a Heads Up Display for his shades, and more. Although many of his technological wonders seem to be trial and error, it's more of his lack of resources than anything that hinders him.
 Ellie Martin/Elastika (voiced by Kari Wahlgren): Ellie is a sporty busybody that always has something to do or somewhere to be. She seems to be involved in everything possible, and almost never has time for fun. Her hair has become incredibly strong and durable after her exposure to the Zevo Compound. Her hair can be spun around like a rotor blade and fly her through the air like a helicopter, compressed into a giant eardrum to enhance her hearing; her hair is even strong enough to toss a city bus and temporarily slow down a giant robot. Ellie is a talented gymnast. In the episode Welcome to Paradise Bay, it is revealed that her worst fear is failing. She is the older sister to Matt/Kewl Breeze and is good friends with Jason/Z-Strap. There seem to be hints of romantic feelings between Jason and Ellie, although they both deny them whenever anything about it is mentioned.
 Grams (voiced by Sheryl Lee Ralph): She is Jason's grandmother who took care of him after his parents were sent out on their missions only to not return. She knows that Jason, Ellie, and Matt have super powers. She admits in the episode welcome to Paradise Beach that she has already faced all her greatest fears. In the episode Shutterbug, she says that she likes Ellie and Jason as a romantic couple. It is later revealed she knows more about Jason's parents and Operation Z than she is letting on.

Villains
 Dr. Stankfoot (voiced by Mark Hamill: Dr. Stankfoot was originally named Stanley K. Foot, the heir to the legacy of the Foot family who founded Footville. A scientist working on the Zevo Compound, he caused the accident changing many people to mutants and turning him to stone. When he was revived by the Zevo Compound decades later, he realized his city had been demolished by Ronson in favor of New Eden City and made it his goal to reclaim his birthright from Ronson. He has shown the ability to create new Lifeforms (Blacktop and Dark Materia) to mutating someone (Mutating Ronson's aide to an insect humanoid like mutant). During his battle with Ronson in the season finale, Stankfoot was hit with Anti-Zevo and is reduced to slime as a result.
 Blacktop: A brainless but powerful shape shifting mutant intentionally from the slime from the bottom of Stankfoot's foot. Being Stankfoot's first creation, Black is devotedly loyal and server as his creator' enforcer. He is constantly destroyed by Zevo-3, but is always getting recreated by Stankfoot, who views him as a kind of son, from whatever remained of him.
 Dark Materia (voiced by Beverly Ann Myers): Dark Materia is a mutant-like homunculus made by Stankfoot from a combination of Dark Matter and pure Zevo compound to keep him company. However, extremely prideful and arrogant, Dark Materia saw Stankfoot as nothing than incompetent fool and harbored a deep hatred for the mad scientist to the point of killing him when given the chance. As a result, she allied herself Ronson a few times in order to perfect her unexpected ability to manipulate all Zevo-affected mutants. However, in the events of "Mutation Termination", she is killed by Stankfoot.
 Mayor Brett Ronson III (voiced by Kevin Michael Richardson): Brett is the one who led the creation of New Eden City, the second of the two main antagonists in the series. Knowing Stankfoot, Ronson may have played a hand in the Zevo Compound. As mayor of New Eden City, he spends time with the community, campaigns of a new city, and hires his city enforcers to aid in his propaganda against all mutants and mutant-related incidents, including the Zevo-3 team. However, Ronson hides a variety of dark secrets that only his enforcers know about: One being that he is a mutant with a tumor-like creature emerging from his back that he treats as a separate entity despite being an aspect of himself. Another dark secret is his master plan is brainwashing people to share his views, his workers being among them. Though unaware of Stankfoot's return at first, Ronson later learns of it while attempting to capture Dark Materia for his agenda before she is killed off. During his own battle with Stankfoot in the season finale, Ronson was hit with Anti-Zevo and becomes a normal human again as he resumes his agenda with Stankfoot no longer a hindrance.

Supporting characters
 Sagacity Acumen (voiced by Kevin Michael Richardson): The guru-like owner of the 6/10 convenience store in New Eden City. He and Grams have been friends for many years and acted as her eyes and ears in New Eden City. He also acts as an advice guru to Jason when he has a problem. He also owns a small piece of hardened Zevo Compound, which, once held, can give brief visions of the future.
 Florence "Flo" Cara (voiced by Grey DeLisle): A brave-hearted paramedic in New Eden City, who occasionally helps out Zevo-3. She seems to know more about Zevo-3 than she appears to be letting on.
 Cotilla (voiced by Grey DeLisle): Ellie's best friend and the local gossip. She is very boy-crazy and frequently calls cute boys "hotties". In the episode Welcome to Paradise Bay, it is revealed that her worst fear is having no boys around at all. She also seems to harbour schoolgirl feelings for Jason and his alter-ego, Z-Strap.
 Angel (voiced by Pamela Adlon): Ellie's other best friend and a gloomy Goth girl. Not much is known about her, except that in the episode Welcome to Paradise Bay, it is revealed that her worst fear is wearing something colorful.
 The Moloks: A group of mutants who were fused to parts of the Footville Subway by the Zevo Compound. They live underground and act quite primitively,
 Bug (voiced by Benjamin Diskin): A green bug-like mutant who lives in Stankville and is the son of the leader of the Moloks. He is very skilled and a bit of a loner, he left the Moloks some time ago. But after being forced to help Z-Strap and Elastika, he returned to them. Now he is an ally to Zevo-3 and continues to have feelings for Ellie, as shown in episode Heart of Darkness.
 Bobby (voiced by Benjamin Diskin): A small blue mutant with metallic limbs and helmet. He and Bug share a "Big-Brother/Little Brother" relationship and he seems to relate to Kewl Breeze. At first, all he could do was make the sound of a Subway stop signal, but thanks to Grams and Matt, he gained the ability to talk.
 The Mengalsons: A family of strange-looking, but quite sentient mutants, who live in a rundown old motel in an old part of Footville. Brett Ronson III tried to tear down their motel, but thanks to Zevo-3, he failed.
 George: The patriarch of the family, a green, slime mutant wearing a white shirt and blue pants.
 Beatrice: George's wife, a tentacled, worm-like mutant with a pink dress and headband
 Thomas and Thomas: George and Beatrice's twin sons, both of them round purple, ball-like mutants with short arms and long legs. They both appear to be very immature and goofy.
 Granny: George's mother and grandmother to his kids, when the Zevo Compound mutated the family, she was fused into the floor and gives the appearance of a green shag rug with a face.
 Caroline (voiced by Tara Strong): George and Beatrice's daughter and Thomas and Thomas' sister, roughly around Matt/Kewl Breeze's age it seems. Of all the Mengalsons, she is the most unusual. For one thing, she seems the most humanoid (not counting her tail, pointed ears and green coloring) and for another, like Zevo-3, the Zevo Compound gave her special powers. She is able to heal any injury (but not always completely). She is very polite and grateful for when Zevo-3 saved her home and family. Matt developed a crush on Caroline the moment he saw her and from what is seen in her appearances so far, the feeling appears to be mutual (In both her appearances, she gave him a kiss on the cheek).

Additional voices
Eric Bauza - Brad
Daran Norris
Jeff Bennett - Barry Brite
Charlie Schlatter
Ian James Corlett - Goon Squad Captain
Jennifer Hale - Laura Lebraun
Nicole Sullivan
Kimberly Brooks

Episodes

Season 1 (2010-11)

References

External links

2010 American television series debuts
2011 American television series endings
2010s American animated television series
2010s American high school television series
2010s American science fiction television series
American children's animated action television series
American children's animated adventure television series
American children's animated science fiction television series
American children's animated superhero television series
English-language television shows
Nicktoons (TV network) original programming
Teen animated television series
Teen superhero television series
Television series by Splash Entertainment
Television series about mutants